The Florida Solar Energy Center (FSEC) is a research institute of the University of Central Florida, located on a 20-acre (.08 km2) research complex on Florida's Space Coast at UCF's Cocoa satellite campus. FSEC is the largest and most active state-supported renewable energy and energy efficiency research, training, testing and certification institute in the United States. The director of the institute is James M. Fenton, Ph.D.

FSEC's mission is to research and develop energy technologies that enhance Florida's and the nation's economy and environment, and to educate the public, students and practitioners on the results of the research. The Center has gained national and international recognition for its wide range of research, education, training and certification activities.

Operations
The Center's 150-member staff includes 95 professionals with expertise in engineering, energy research, building science, energy and policy analysis, and education and training. The remainder of the staff consists of technical and administrative support personnel and university student assistants. Research at FSEC is based on field monitoring, computer simulations and controlled experiments in highly instrumented laboratories. These research efforts are developed in partnership with industry, nonprofit organizations, private sponsors and national laboratories.

Research and grants
In October 2009, the United States Department of Energy provided a $2.8 million grant to Solar Energy Center to help lead efforts to create and manage the newly created Solar Installer Instructor Training Network. "The training network is a five-year effort intended to create a geographic blanket of training opportunities in solar installations across the United States. Its goals are to accelerate market adoption of solar technologies by ensuring that high-quality installations are standard and to create sustainable jobs within the solar installation industry. FSEC will operate the Southeast region of the seven-region network."

See also
Zero-energy building
United States Department of Energy
University of Central Florida research centers

References

External links
Florida Solar Energy Center Website

University of Central Florida
Research institutes in Florida
Environmental research institutes
Energy research institutes
1975 establishments in Florida
Buildings and structures in Brevard County, Florida
Cocoa, Florida
Solar energy in the United States